Pierre Even may refer to:
Pierre Even (composer) (born 1946), Luxembourgian composer
Pierre Even (producer), Canadian film producer
Pierre Even (cyclist), French cyclist participant in the 1950 UCI Track Cycling World Championships